Emmerson Nogueira (born Emmerson Oliveira Nogueira on September 23, 1973) is a Brazilian guitarist and songwriter notable for releasing only cover albums, containing acoustic versions of several internationally famous English-speaking songs. He performs with his supporting band called Versão Acústica.

Childhood 
Emmerson was born in Belo Horizonte, Minas Gerais, to Luiz Carlos Nogueira and Bernardina de Oliveira, and soon moved to São João Nepomuceno, also in Minas Gerais. He has five siblings: Heloiza, Anderson, Renata, Juninho e Helena.

He first got involved with music by the age of 14. By that time, he also developed an interest for drawing, but soon quit it to devote to music.

As an evangelical, he performed on a local church and won many festivals of Gospel music. He soon moved to Juiz de Fora, without the approval of his family, who didn't believe he could survive all by himself. Those were difficult times for him, but he couldn't tell anything to his parents, otherwise his father would take him back to the family. He would play with friends in local pubs and restaurants for a living.

Back to São João Nepomuceno, he formed various bands like "The Kingsize Tailors and The Nicotinos", "Led Zeppelin Cover", " The Wait " and "Xadcaramelo" and continued to perform in pubs. He also made several partnerships with people like Ana Carolina, who invited him to perform in her Ana Carolina Convida show, where he was much acclaimed for his guitar playing. He also once partnered with his cousin Kiko Furtado, the Brazilian singer Cristiane Visentin and Leoni, ex-singer of Kid Abelha.

Career
In 2000, one of his dreams came true, he presented his works to Sony Music and was subsequently signed with them. In the same year he released his first album, called Versão Acústica. The success was so great that he had to return home to Brazil to go on tour for the album. The album sold more than 100,000 copies in the first six months, without any media exposure at all. The following album, Versão Acústica 2, released in November 2002, sold twice as fast as his first. The third Versão Acústica sold very well too. In 2004, he released an album containing only The Beatles covers. In 2005, he released his fifth album, called Miltons, Minas e Mais in which he explored the sound of famous musicians from Minas Gerais, like Milton Nascimento.

Discography

Studio albums 
 (2001) Versão Acústica
 (2002) Versão Acústica 2
 (2003) Versão Acústica 3
 (2004) Beatles
 (2005) Miltons, Minas e Mais
 (2008) Dreamer
 (2009) Versão Acústica 4
 (2014) Emmerson Nogueira

Live albums 
 (2003) Emmerson Nogueira ao Vivo
 (2007) Emmerson Nogueira ao Vivo

References

 Emmerson Nogueira’s biography at his official fan-club

External links
 Official Site 
 Official Fan-Club 
 Emmerson Nogueira at Sony BGM Brasil 

1973 births
Living people
Brazilian male guitarists
Brazilian music arrangers
People from Belo Horizonte
Brazilian rock singers
21st-century Brazilian male singers
21st-century Brazilian singers
21st-century guitarists